Dumitru Mârza was a Bessarabian politician. He was born in Bădragii Vechi.

Biography 

He served as Member of the Moldavian Parliament (1917–1918).

Gallery

Bibliography 
Gheorghe E. Cojocaru, Sfatul Țării: itinerar, Civitas, Chişinău, 1998, 
Mihai Taşcă, Sfatul Țării şi actualele autorităţi locale, "Timpul de dimineaţă", no. 114 (849), June 27, 2008 (page 16)

External links 
 Arhiva pentru Sfatul Tarii
 Deputaţii Sfatului Ţării şi Lavrenti Beria

Notes

1894 births
1967 deaths
Romanian people of Moldovan descent